The Rheinmetall Oerlikon Millennium Gun or Rheinmetall GDM-008 is a close-in weapon system designed by Rheinmetall Air Defence AG (formerly known as Oerlikon Contraves) for mounting on ships. It is based on the 35/1000 revolver gun land-based air defense system and uses Advanced Hit Efficiency And Destruction (AHEAD) ammunition.

Description
A device at the muzzle end of the barrel measures the exact speed of each round as it is fired, and automatically sets the fuse to detonate the round as it approaches a pre-set distance from the target. Each round disperses 152 small tungsten projectiles weighing  each to form a lethal cone-shaped cloud to strike the incoming target. Whilst these are too small to do major damage in themselves, the accumulation of damage from multiple strikes is expected to destroy wings and control surfaces, sensors and aerodynamics, causing the target to crash. Other firing modes are designed to be effective against surface targets such as small fast attack boats.

The weapon is designed to be controlled by an external fire-control system using either radar or electro-optical trackers. It is fitted with an optional onboard observation TV camera which relays imagery to an operator console from which it can also be aimed and fired in an emergency mode. The computer system uses an open architecture and is claimed to be compatible with many existing fire control systems.

The gun's ammunition capacity allows it to engage 10 anti-ship missiles or 20 surface targets.

Users

 Absalon-class frigate
 Iver Huitfeldt-class frigate

 Martadinata-class frigate

Future Users

 The Bulgarian Navy's new corvettes (MMPV 90) are planned to be armed with the Millennium gun

 Type 31 frigate (Planned)
 OPV 90M (Planned)

 Al Jubail-class corvette

See also
Nächstbereichschutzsystem MANTIS ground-based C-RAM by Rheinmetall using same gun
Oerlikon 35 mm twin cannon earlier system using AHEAD rounds
Aselsan GOKDENIZ—comparable Turkish system
Denel 35mm Dual Purpose Gun comparable South African CIWS

References

External links 

Rheinmetall Defence information

 

Oerlikon-Contraves
35
Close-in weapon systems
Autocannon
35 mm artillery
Military equipment introduced in the 2000s